At the 2011 Pan Arab Games, the fencing events were held at Aspire Zone in Doha, Qatar from 18–23 December. A total of 12 events were contested.

Medal summary

Men

Women

Medal table

References

External links
Fencing at official website

Pan Arab Games
Events at the 2011 Pan Arab Games
2011 Pan Arab Games
Fencing competitions in Qatar